Bythorn and Keyston is a civil parish in the Huntingdonshire district of Cambridgeshire, England.  According to the 2001 census the parish had a population of 271, increasing to 316 at the 2011 Census.

The parish was formed in 1935 by the merger of the parishes of Bythorn and Keyston.
Now the A14 runs through the parish separating them as two different villages.

Demography

Population
In the period 1801 to 1901 the populations of the two separate parishes of Bythorn and of Keyston were recorded every ten years by the UK census.  During this time the population was in the range of 283 (the lowest was in 1901) and 515 (the highest was in 1861).

From 1901, a census was taken every ten years with the exception of 1941 (due to the Second World War).

All population census figures from report Historic Census figures Cambridgeshire to 2011 by Cambridgeshire Insight.

References

External links

Huntingdonshire
Civil parishes in Cambridgeshire